Bad Boys is the fourth and final studio album by the original formation of Spanish duo Baccara, first released on label RCA-Victor in Germany in 1981. It contains European single release "Colorado". This is the first album to have not been produced by Rolf Soja. The album was produced by Graham Sacher in London, UK. The typical Baccara sound of early albums was gone, a more pop-rock album was the result. Also missing was the original Baccara logo that was on the three albums produced before Bad Boys. This album was not a commercial success nor did it sell as much as the first three albums. This album would be the last time the original girls would record together.

The rights to the RCA-Victor back catalogue are currently held by Sony BMG Music Entertainment - the original Bad Boys album in its entirety remains unreleased on compact disc. However, all tracks can be found on the 3-disc 30th Anniversary box set issued in 2007.

Track listing
All tracks composed by Graham Sacher and arranged by Bruce Baxter

Side A
 "Bad Boys" - 4:25
 "Last Night" - 2:50
 "Ohio" - 3:04
 "Love Control" - 2:57 
 "Spend the Night" - 3:07 
 "Rio" - 3:46

Side B
 "Boogaloo" - 2:38
 "Colorado" - 3:30 
 "Mucho Mucho" - 3:25
 "Woman to Woman" - 3:36
 "Heart, Body and Soul" - 4:09
 "Love Songs" - 3:36

Personnel
 Mayte Mateos - vocals
 María Mendiola - vocals

Baccara albums
1981 albums
RCA Records albums